Ubayd Allah ibn Abd Allah ibn Zuhayr ibn Abd Allah ibn Jud'an al-Taymi was a Medinian hadith narrator. He was possibly the qadi of Ta'if for caliph Abd Allah ibn al-Zubayr. He retold the event of the pen and paper as he heard from Ibn Abbas.

See also
Urwa ibn al-Zubayr

References

External links
http://www.sacred-texts.com/isl/bukhari/bh1/bh1_114.htm

Companions of the Prophet
Tabi‘un hadith narrators
7th-century people from the Umayyad Caliphate